La fida ninfa (The Faithful Nymph, RV 714) is an opera by Antonio Vivaldi to a libretto by Scipione Maffei. The opera was first performed for the opening of the Teatro Filarmonico in Verona on 6 January 1732. Among the arias is Alma oppressa de sorte crudele (Soul oppressed by cruel fate).

Recording
 La fida ninfa - Sandrine Piau, Veronica Cangemi, Marie-Nicole Lemieux, Lorenzo Regazzo, Philippe Jaroussky, Sara Mingardo, Ensemble Matheus, Jean-Christophe Spinosi Naive, 3CDs Recorded Église Notre-Dame du Liban, Paris April/May 2008

See also
List of operas by Antonio Vivaldi

References

Further reading
Il teatro di Scipione Maffei (La Merope, Le cerimonie, Il raguet, e La fida ninfa). Edited by Teresa Copelli, Luigi Battei, Parma, 1905. 

Operas by Antonio Vivaldi
Operas
1732 operas
Italian-language operas